Grete Margaret Schüller  (1900–1984) is an American sculptor best known, along with John B. Flannagan and William Zorach, for works in direct carving (direct carvers) (also known as taille directe) in the United States. She maintained a studio in both New York City and in Long Island.

Early years
Schüller, born in Austria on April 26, 1900, was a twentieth century contemporary artist devoted to the creation of animal-inspired sculptures. Through a lifetime of artistic experimentation, she created works, at once subtle and bold, traditional and modern, setting a new standard in a subject matter directly connecting with nature.

Permanent museum collections
Norfolk Museum for Arts and Sciences, Norfolk, Virginia: Sculpture: "Motherhood"
American Museum of Natural History, New York City: Sculpture "Frog"
Museum of Science, Boston, Massachusetts: Sculpture: "Who Came First"

Exhibitions
Sculpture Center, New York City: One Woman Show, 1958
A.F.I. Gallery, New York City: One Woman Show, 1963
ROKO Gallery, New York City: One Woman Show, 1966

Group exhibitions
Audubon Artists
National Academy of Design
Allied Artists of America
National Sculpture Society
Knickerbocker Artists
National Association of Women Artists
Art U.S.A.
Catharine Lorillard Wolfe Art Club
Invitational Exhibitions:
Detroit Institute of Arts
Pennsylvania Academy of Design
Des Moines Art Center
The Academy of arts and Letters for Grants, New York City
University of Notre Dame
150 Years of American Art, New Westbury Gardens
The Pennsylvania Academy of The Fine Arts
The Animal in Contemporary Art, Philadelphia, Pennsylvania

References

1900 births
1984 deaths
20th-century American sculptors
19th-century American sculptors
American women sculptors
National Association of Women Artists members
Austro-Hungarian emigrants to the United States
American people of Austrian descent
19th-century American women artists
20th-century American women artists